Ariel Beery is a social entrepreneur based in Israel, active in addressing healthcare inequities in the global south. He was a founder of the social venture accelerator the PresenTense Group, the women's health technology company MobileODT (previously MobileOCT), and the cooperative effort to expand access to diagnostics to the global south, CoVelocity.

Early life and education
Beery was born in New York City, to Itzhak Beery (a painter, graphic designer, now shaman), and Margalit Beery (a dancer, now social worker). Beery was educated in the NYC Public School system, attending PS3, The Center School, and Stuyvesant High School. Beery was active in the socialist Zionist youth movement, Hashomer Hatzair, and, following a year at Wesleyan University, moved to Israel to serve his youth movement in People to People work with Palestinians in the Gaza Strip. Beery returned to his studies at Columbia University through its School of General Studies, where he served as Student Body President in 2004-2005. During his time at Columbia, Ariel took an active role in the Columbia Unbecoming controversy. Following the release of the film Columbia Unbecoming in fall 2004, alleging classroom intimidation of pro-Israel students by pro-Palestinian professors, he co-founded Columbians for Academic Freedom (CAF) together with Aharon Horwitz, Daniella Kahane, and Bari Weiss. 

In 2006, Beery began studies towards an MA in Jewish Philosophy at the Jewish Theological Seminary of America, leaving the program to gain an MPA and MA from NYU in nonprofit management and Jewish history. In 2008 Beery was a finalist for the Bronfman Professorship at Brandeis University, and Beery has taught undergraduate and graduate courses at the Interdisciplinary Center in Herzliya.

Career
While a student at the Jewish Theological Seminary, Beery founded PresenTense Magazine, a publication focused on social innovation in the global Jewish community. Beery joined with Aharon Horwitz to expand PresenTense's activities in 2007 to create the PresenTense Institute for Creative Zionism, a 'summer camp for social entrepreneurs' in Jerusalem. The merger of the two in 2008 created the PresenTense Group, which Beery ran as co-director and Global CEO until 2012. In 2012, Beery handed over leadership in PresenTense to Shelby Zeitelman and Naomi Korb Weiss, and co-founded MobileODT with his childhood friend, Dr. David Levitz. In 2020, following a power struggle with MobileODT's main investor, OrbiMed, Beery left MobileODT and co-founded CoVelocity.

Works
Do No Evil, published January 13th 2013

References 

Israeli businesspeople
American Jews
People from New York City
New York University alumni
Academic staff of Reichman University

Year of birth missing (living people)
Living people
Columbia University School of General Studies alumni